Sängkammartjuven is a 1959 Swedish comedy film directed by Göran Gentele. It was entered into the 10th Berlin International Film Festival.

Cast
 Jarl Kulle - Johan Jacob Wenkel
 Gaby Stenberg - Madeleine Messing
 Lena Söderblom - Lola Hallberg
 Holger Löwenadler - Kurt Månstedt
 Lars Ekborg - Anders Månstedt
 Douglas Håge - Eriksson
 Björn Gustafson - Robert / Don Roberto
 Hjördis Petterson - Guest at party
 Rune Halvarsson - Carlsson
 Birgitta Andersson - Journalist
 Inga Gill - Barwaitress

References

External links

1959 films
1950s Swedish-language films
1959 comedy films
Films directed by Göran Gentele
Swedish comedy films
1950s Swedish films